The Owen Sound Attack are a junior ice hockey team in the Ontario Hockey League based in Owen Sound, Ontario, Canada. Based in Owen Sound since 1989, and operating under the current name since 2000, the Attack play their home games at the J.D. McArthur Arena inside the Harry Lumley Bayshore Community Centre.

History

The Owen Sound OHL franchise was born when the Holody family moved the Guelph Platers to the city for the 1989–90 OHL season. The team kept the name of Owen Sound Platers.

The Owen Sound Attack were born in the late summer of the year 2000 as a community-based OHL franchise. When the Holody family decided to sell the Owen Sound Platers buyers were sought from any city.

Several local Owen Sound business people realized that an out-of-town buyer would mean losing the team to relocation. The most mentioned former OHL city was Cornwall, Ontario. This local business group banded together to purchase the team. After a bidding war and a summer-long legal battle with another suitor, the team remained in Owen Sound.

The ownership group elected for a name change and came up with the more modern sounding "Owen Sound Attack". The 2004–05 season was the best regular season in the OHL history of Owen Sound. General Manager Mike Futa was recognized by the OHL for his work in building the team with the OHL Executive of the Year award. The club also played host to the OHL All-Star Classic in 2005.

In 2010–11, the Attack wore the jerseys of the 1951 Allan Cup Champion Owen Sound Mercurys as a throwback third jersey.

On April 27, 2011, the Owen Sound Attack earned their first OHL Conference Championship and their first berth in the Memorial Cup tournament since relocating from Guelph with a 10–4 win over the defending champion Windsor Spitfires and a result of the Memorial Cup host team, Mississauga St. Michael's Majors winning their conference series, 4–1 over the Niagara IceDogs.

On May 15, 2011, the Attack won their first J. Ross Robertson Cup as OHL Champions, also since relocating from Guelph with a 3–2 overtime win over the Mississauga St. Michael's Majors in the seventh game of the OHL finals.

As of the end of the 2013–14 season, the Attack were one of five OHL teams to win 30 or more games in the past four seasons, joining London, Guelph, Saginaw and Oshawa.

The Attack set a new franchise attendance mark in 2011–12 of 97,619 fans and set a new record the following year, eclipsing the 100,000 mark in 2012–13 and again in 2013–14.

Coaches
2000–2001, Brian O'Leary
2001–2002, Frank Carnevale
2002–2007, Mike Stothers
2007–2011, Mark Reeds
2011–2015, Greg Ireland
2015–2017, Ryan McGill
2017–2019, Todd Gill
2019–2021, Alan Letang
2021–present, Greg Walters

Players
Andrew Brunette won the 1992–93 Eddie Powers Memorial Trophy as the top scorer in the OHL with 62 Goals, 100 Assists and 162 Points. He also tied for the Canadian Hockey League's scoring lead. Brunette was selected by the Washington Capitals 174th overall in the 7th round of 1993 NHL Entry Draft.

Jamie Storr was the 1993–94 OHL Goaltender of the Year. Storr was the starting goalie for back-to-back World Junior Hockey Championship Gold medals in 1993 and 1994. In the 1994 NHL Entry Draft he became what was then the highest-drafted goaltender overall in NHL history, by the Los Angeles Kings, 7th overall.

Dan Snyder, a former captain of the Owen Sound Platers, had his number 14 retired by the Owen Sound Attack in 2003. He is remembered in Owen Sound for his leadership on and off the ice. Snyder was twice voted his team's Humanitarian of the Year. Snyder died from injuries suffered in a vehicular accident in 2003 after just beginning his NHL career with the Atlanta Thrashers, and the Ontario Hockey League renamed its Humanitarian of the Year award posthumously in his honour.

NHL alumni
Alumni of the Owen Sound Attack who played in the National Hockey League (NHL).

Mike Angelidis
Josh Bailey
Chris Bigras
Jordan Binnington
Paul Bissonnette
Jesse Blacker
Joseph Blandisi
Daniel Catenacci
Andre Deveaux
Sean Durzi
Kurtis Gabriel
Mark Giordano
Mike Halmo
Joey Hishon
Greg Jacina
Dan LaCosta
Trevor Lewis
Kurtis MacDermid
Brian McGrattan
Chris Minard
Phil Oreskovic
Theo Peckham
Brad Richardson
Stefan Ruzicka
Bobby Ryan
Bob Sanguinetti
Andrej Sekera
Andrew Shaw
Wayne Simmonds
Nick Suzuki
Garrett Wilson

Yearly results

Regular season
 1989–2000 as Owen Sound Platers
 2000–present as Owen Sound Attack

Legend: OTL = Overtime loss, SL = Shootout loss

Playoffs
1989–90 Defeated Sudbury Wolves 4 games to 3 in first round. Lost to Niagara Falls Thunder 4 games to 1 in quarter-finals.
1990–91 Did not qualify.
1991–92 Lost to London Knights 4 games to 1 in first round.
1992–93 Defeated Niagara Falls Thunder 4 games to 0 in first round. Lost to S.S. Marie Greyhounds 4 games to 0 in quarter-finals.
1993–94 Defeated Kitchener Rangers 4 games to 1 in division quarter-finals. Lost to Detroit Jr. Red Wings 4 games to 0 in division semi-finals.
1994–95 Defeated Niagara Falls Thunder 4 games to 2 in division quarter-finals. Lost to Guelph Storm 4 games to 0 in quarter-finals.
1995–96 Lost to Niagara Falls Thunder 4 games to 2 in division quarter-finals.
1996–97 Lost to Barrie Colts 4 games to 0 in division quarter-finals.
1997–98 Defeated Kitchener Rangers 4 games to 2 in division quarter-finals. Lost to Ottawa 67's 4 games to 1 in quarter-finals.
1998–99 Defeated S.S.Marie Greyhounds 4 games to 1 in conference quarter-finals. Defeated Guelph Storm 4 games to 2 in conference semi-finals. Lost to London Knights 4 games to 1 in conference finals.
1999–2000 Did not qualify.
2000–01 Lost to Windsor Spitfires 4 games to 1 in conference quarter-finals.
2001–02 Did not qualify.
2002–03 Lost to Plymouth Whalers 4 games to 0 in conference quarter-finals.
2003–04 Lost to Guelph Storm 4 games to 3 in conference quarter-finals.
2004–05 Defeated Plymouth Whalers 4 games to 0 in conference quarter-finals. Lost to Kitchener Rangers 4 games to 0 in conference semi-finals.
2005–06 Defeated Kitchener Rangers 4 games to 1 in conference quarter-finals. Lost to London Knights 4 games to 2 in conference semi-finals.
2006–07 Lost to London Knights 4 games to 0 in conference quarter-finals.
2007–08 Did not qualify.
2008–09 Lost to Windsor Spitfires 4 games to 0 in conference quarter-finals.
2009-10 Did not qualify.
2010–11 Defeated London Knights 4 games to 2 in conference quarter-finals. Defeated Plymouth Whalers 4 games to 0 in conference semi-finals. Defeated Windsor Spitfires 4 games to 1 in conference finals. Defeated Mississauga Majors 4 games to 3 in finals. OHL CHAMPIONS Finished Memorial Cup round-robin in third place.  Lost to Kootenay Ice 7–3 in tie-breaking game.
2011–12 Lost to Kitchener Rangers 4 games to 1 in conference quarter-finals.
2012–13 Defeated Sault Ste. Marie Greyhounds 4 games to 2 in conference quarter-finals. Lost to Plymouth Whalers 4 games to 2 in conference semi-finals.
2013–14 Lost to Sault Ste. Marie Greyhounds 4 games to 1 in conference quarter-finals.
2014–15 Lost to Guelph Storm 4 games to 1 in conference quarter-finals.
2015–16 Lost to London Knights 4 games to 2 in conference quarter-finals.
2016–17 Defeated Kitchener Rangers 4 games to 1 in conference quarter-finals. Defeated Sault Ste. Marie Greyhounds 4 games to 2 in conference semi-finals. Lost to Erie Otters 4 games to 2 in conference finals.
2017–18 Defeated London Knights 4 games to 0 in conference quarter-finals. Lost to Sault Ste. Marie Greyhounds 4 games to 3 in conference semi-finals.
2018–19 Lost to Sault Ste. Marie Greyhounds 4 games to 1 in conference quarter-finals.
2019–20 Cancelled.
2020–21 Cancelled.
2021-22 Lost to Flint Firebirds 4 games to 3 in conference quarter-finals.

Uniforms and logos

Uniform colours: Black, white, gold, and red
Logo design: An angry bear head
Mascot: Cubby
2010–11 third jersey: Blue, red, and white with Owen Sound Mercurys logo

Arena
The Harry Lumley Bayshore Community Centre received extensive renovations beginning in 2001. Private boxes and a restaurant were added, as well as upgrading the facility in general. A new video scoreboard was added in 2015. The arena hosted the 2005 OHL All-Star Classic.
Capacity = 3000 seated
Ice size = 200' x 85'

The Bayshore Community Centre is also home to  the Owen Sound Rams of the OLA Junior B Lacrosse League, and the Owen Sound Woodsmen of the OLA Senior B Lacrosse League.

See also
List of ice hockey teams in Ontario

References

External links

Owen Sound Atack official website
Ontario Hockey League official website
Canadian Hockey League official website

Ontario Hockey League teams
Sport in Owen Sound
Ice hockey clubs established in 2000
2000 establishments in Ontario